Omid Dorreh (born August 8, 1999) is an Iranian footballer who plays as a defender for Iranian club Saipa in the Persian Gulf Pro League.

Club career

Saipa
He made his debut for Saipa in 13th fixtures of 2018–19 Iran Pro League against Padideh while he substituted in for Abdollah Nasseri.

References

Living people
1999 births
Association football defenders
Saipa F.C. players
Sportspeople from Tehran
Association football players not categorized by nationality